Chris Quilala is an American Christian musician and worship leader with the Jesus Culture band and formerly with the Bethel Music collective. He primarily plays Christian pop and contemporary worship music.

Personal life
Quilala met his future wife, Alyssa Gulino, when she was seventeen and he was twenty-five while they were in a church in Pasadena. They have five children together: Ella, Aria, Jethro (d. 2014), Liv and Maddex. After Chris and Alyssa's son Jethro died in December 2014, they wrote the song Miracles, which appeared on Jesus Culture's 2016 album Let It Echo. The Quilala family resides in Sacramento, California. Chris Quilala and Alyssa divorced in 2019.

In December 2019, Quilala was one of several evangelical Christian worship leaders to pray for President Donald Trump in the Oval Office.

Music career
Quilala has been part of the Jesus Culture movement, since he was fourteen years old in 1996.  He has been featured on many Jesus Culture albums, including Everything (2006), We Cry Out (2007), Your Love Never Fails (2008), Consumed (2009), Come Away (2010), Awakening: Live from Chicago (2011), Live From New York (with Martin Smith) (2012), Unstoppable Love (2014), and Let It Echo (2016). Quilala's debut solo album, Split the Sky, was released in 2016. Recently, Quilala co-wrote the song "Your Love Awakens Me" with Phil Wickham, which appears on Wickham's album Children of God (2016).

Along with being a guitarist, Chris is also a drummer. He started his musical career playing drums for Bethel Music. He was the drummer for the albums For the Sake of the World (2012) and Be Lifted High (2011) as well as Brian & Jenn Johnson's albums, We Believe (2006) and Where You Go I Go (2008). He also featured on Bethel's debut album Here Is Love (2010) performing the song "King of Wonders".

Discography

Albums

Singles

As lead artist

As a featured artist

Other charted songs

Awards

Grammy Awards

GMA Dove Awards

ASCAP Christian Awards

BMI Christian Awards

References

External links 
 Record label website

1982 births
Living people
American performers of Christian music
Musicians from California
Songwriters from California
People from Redding, California
Musicians from Sacramento, California
Performers of contemporary worship music
Performers of contemporary Christian music